Power Couple, also known as Power Couple Brasil, is a Brazilian reality competition based on the Israeli television series . The series premiered on Tuesday, April 12, 2016 at 10:30 p.m. on RecordTV.

The show features celebrity couples living under one roof and facing extreme challenges that will test how well they really know each other. Each week, a couple will be eliminated until the last couple wins the grand prize.

The first two seasons were hosted by Roberto Justus. From seasons three to four, Gugu Liberato replaced Justus as the host and production moved from São Paulo to Itapecerica da Serra. From season five onwards, Adriane Galisteu replaced Gugu (dead since late–2019), thus becoming the show's first female host.

The fifth season was originally expected to air in 2020, but production was postponed to 2021 due to safety concerns resulting from the COVID-19 pandemic.

Season chronology

Records

Highest number of rejections

Spin-offs

Power Couple Live
An online spin-off show titled Power Couple Live was originally presented by Gianne Albertoni. The show is broadcast live on Facebook after every episode and is also available on-demand via R7 Play. It features interviews with the newly eliminated couples, as well special guests and exclusive content across social media sites like YouTube. For season 2, Albertoni was replaced by Junno Andrade who presented until the third season, with Dani Bavoso reading questions from netizens.

In fourth season, the couple Flávia Viana and Marcelo Zangrandi assume the presentation, also counting on the youtubers Tati Martins and Marcelo Carlos, from the WebTVBrasileira channel, as commentators. The fifth season passed to the command of Lidi Lisboa and the return of Dani Bavoso.

Podcast Power Couple
Since 2021, Dani Bavoso also started to present a podcast, available on YouTube and streaming platforms, interviewing couples who have been through the program in previous seasons.

Ratings

References

External links
  on R7.com

 
2016 Brazilian television series debuts
2022 Brazilian television series endings
Brazilian reality television series
Portuguese-language television shows
RecordTV original programming